The Man on the Balcony is a 1993 Swedish-German crime thriller film, based on the 1967 book The Man on the Balcony written by Maj Sjöwall and Per Wahlöö. This is the fourth film which stars Gösta Ekman as Martin Beck and Rolf Lassgård as Gunvald Larsson.

"Mannen på balkongen" has been considered as the best ever Martin Beck film starring Gösta Ekman, and Gösta Ekman became highly popular and regarded for his brilliant portrayal of Martin Beck in this picture by his fans. His fine performance also attracted several new fans to his side, and "The Man on the Balcony" was one of the most successful films in Sweden in the year of 1993.

Plot
A mad serial killer terrorizes Stockholm in the hot summer of 1993, by abducting, raping and strangling young schoolgirls to death in the green parks of the inner town. When the first girl is found dead in the Vanadislunden Park, Martin Beck and his team receives the case on their desk and realizes that this will become one of their most emotional investigations ever, especially for Beck's younger colleague Lennart Kollberg who himself has a little daughter. An old lady was robbed by an unknown robber in the park at the same time as the murder was committed, which means that Martin Beck must catch the robber first, as he is the only key witness.

Cast
Gösta Ekman as Martin Beck
Kjell Bergqvist as Lennart Kollberg
Rolf Lassgård as Gunvald Larsson
Niklas Hjulström as Benny Skacke
Tova Magnusson Norling as Putte Beck
Jonas Falk as Stig-Åke Malm
Bernt Ström as Einar Rönn
Ulf Friberg as Åke Persson
Ing-Marie Carlsson as Gun Kollberg
Magdalena Ritter as Susanne Grassman
Carl-Magnus Dellow as Policeman
Michael Kausch as Fransson
Udo Schenk as Miroslav Dragan
Åsa Göransson as Lisbeth Karlström
Monica Nielsen as Kiosk aunt
Johanna Ström as Lena
Ellen Swedenmark as Karin
Christina Ådén as Eva
Elias Ringqvist as Pelle
Fredrik Ådén as Erik
Maj Sjöwall as Teacher

Awards
At the 29th Guldbagge Awards the film won the award for Best Screenplay (Daniel Alfredson, Jonas Cornell). It was also nominated for Best Film, Best Director (Alfredson) and Best Cinematography (Peter Mokrosinski).

References

External links

German crime thriller films
Swedish crime thriller films
Martin Beck films
Films directed by Daniel Alfredson
1993 directorial debut films
1990s Swedish-language films
1990s German films
1990s Swedish films